Joseph A. McCartin (born May 12, 1959) is a professor of history at Georgetown University whose research focuses on labor unions in the United States. He also serves as the executive director of the Kalmanovitz Initiative for Labor and the Working Poor.

Early life and education

McCartin was born in Chelsea, Massachusetts, in 1959, and is the son of Joseph and Marybeth  McCartin. Joseph McCartin is of Irish descent, and resided in Troy, New York as a child.   In 1981 he received his bachelor's degree in history from the College of the Holy Cross in Worcester, Massachusetts, in 1985 he received a master's degree, and in 1990 a doctor of philosophy, both from Binghamton University.

From 1990 to 1992, he was a lecturer at the University of Rhode Island.  In 1992, he was appointed an assistant professor at the State University of New York at Geneseo. In 1998 he was promoted to associate professor, and in 1999, McCartin took a position at Georgetown University in Washington, D.C., where he is now a professor and the executive director of the Kalmanovitz Initiative for Labor and the Working Poor.

His brother is noted Catholic historian James McCartin.

Research focus
McCartin is a historical institutionalist whose research focuses on the history of labor unions in the United States during the 20th century.  McCartin is a strong advocate of industrial democracy, an economic arrangement in which workers share in the management of the workplace.  He has challenged many of the labor movement's closely held beliefs, including the idea that the PATCO air traffic controllers' strike of 1981 began, rather than culminated, an attack on labor rights in the United States.
According to the review by Braham Dabscheck in a leading British scholarly journal, his Collision Course;
provides a compelling and thorough account of the background to this dispute, its machinations and broader implications. It is a tour-de-force, an exemplary work of scholarship....he interviewed more than 100 people involved in the dispute....[He] hunted down official sources and documents as well as the records and memorabilia of PATCO and its members and supporters in various facilities across the nation. His narrative includes blow-by-blow accounts of meetings and negotiation sessions held, whether they are within PATCO, the FAA and the White House or across the bargaining table.

Awards
McCartin's 1997 book, Labor’s Great War: The Struggle for Industrial Democracy and the Origins of Modern American Labor Relations, 1912-21, won the 1999 Philip Taft Labor History Book Award for the best book on labor history.

McCartin's article, " 'Fire the Hell Out of Them': Sanitation Workers' Struggles and the Normalization of the Striker Replacement Strategy in the 1970s", won the Labor: Studies in Working-Class History of the Americas prize as the best article on labor history published in 2005.

McCartin was named a fellow of the National Endowment for the Humanities in 1993 and again in 2002.  In 2003, he was named a Charles Warren Fellow at Harvard University.

Published works

Solely authored books
Labor’s Great War: The Struggle for Industrial Democracy and the Origins of Modern American Labor Relations, 1912-21. Chapel Hill: The University of North Carolina Press, 1997. 
 Collision Course: Ronald Reagan, the Air Traffic Controllers, and the Strike that Changed America. Oxford University Press, 2011.

Co-authored books
McCartin, Joseph A. and Dubofsky, Melvyn. American Labor: A Documentary Collection. New York: Palgrave-Macmillan, 2004.

Co-edited books
Kazin, Michael and McCartin, Joseph A, eds. Americanism: New Perspectives on the History of an Ideal. Chapel Hill: University of North Carolina Press, 2006. 
Dubofsky, Melvyn. We Shall Be All: A History of the Industrial Workers of the World. Abridged edition. Joseph A. McCartin, ed. Urbana: University of Illinois Press, 2000. 
Leon Fink, Joseph A. McCartin, and Joan Sangster, eds. Workers in Hard Times: A Long View of Economic Crises. University of Illinois Press, 2014. .
Milkman, Ruth. What Works for Workers: Public Policies and Innovative Strategies for Low Wage Workers. Stephanie Luce, Jennifer Luff, and Joseph A. McCartin, eds. Russell Sage Foundation Publications, 2014.

Solely authored articles
"Re-Framing the Crisis of U.S. Labor: Rights, Democracy, and Political Economy." Labour/Le Travail. 2007.
"Bringing the State’s Workers In: Time to Rectify an Imbalanced U.S. Labor Historiography." Labor History. 47:1 (2006).
" 'Fire the Hell Out of Them': Sanitation Workers’ Struggles and the Normalization of the Striker Replacement Strategy in the 1970s." Labor: Studies in the Working-Class History. 2:3 (2005).
"Democratizing the Demand for Workers’ Rights: Toward a Reframing of Labor's Argument." Dissent. 2005.

Solely authored book chapters
"Utraque Unum: Finding My Way as a Catholic and a Historian." In Faith and the Historian: Catholic Perspectives. Nick Salvatore, ed. Urbana: University of Illinois Press, 2007. 
"Managing Discontent: The Life and Career of Leamon Hood, Black Public Employee Union Activist." In The Black Worker: Race, Labor, and Civil Rights Since Emancipation. Eric Arnesen, ed. Urbana: University of Illinois Press, 2007.

Notes

External links
Georgetown University
Philip Taft Labor History Book Award

References
"Joseph McCartin," Georgetown University
Who's Who in America. 59th ed. New Providence, NJ: Marquis Who's Who, 2004. 

Labor historians
Binghamton University alumni
Harvard Fellows
Writers from Chelsea, Massachusetts
21st-century American historians
21st-century American male writers
Historians of the United States
1959 births
Living people
Historians from Massachusetts
American male non-fiction writers